Events in the year 1803 in Art.

Events
Summer – The Stafford Gallery at Cleveland House, London, the private art collection of the Marquess of Stafford's family (including many paintings from the Orleans Collection), is first opened to the public (by invitation).

Works
James Barry – Self-portrait as Timanthes
Louis-Léopold Boilly
The Arrival of the Diligence (stagecoach) in the Courtyard of the Messageries
Jean-Antoine Houdon modeling the bust of Laplace in his atelier (c.1803-04)
Adam Buck – Mary Anne Clarke
John Sell Cotman – watercolours
Bedlam Furnace Near Irongate [sic.], Shropshire
Ruins of Rievaulx Abbey
Philip James de Loutherbourg – An Avalanche in the Alps
Henry Fuseli – The Blind Polyphemus, at the Entrance to His Cave, Strokes the Ram under which Odysseus Lies Concealed
François Gérard – Portrait of Napoleon Bonaparte, First Consul
Thomas Douglas Guest – Portrait of Joseph Wilton
Christian Horneman – Portrait miniature of Ludwig van Beethoven
Utamaro – Sakizoroi shintaku no kachan ("Array of blooms in the flower beds at the new quarters") (print series; approximate date)

Awards
The Prix de Rome is expanded in 1803 to include musical composition as a category.
 Grand Prix de Rome, painting:
 Grand Prix de Rome, sculpture:
 Grand Prix de Rome, architecture:
 Grand Prix de Rome, music: Albert Androt.

Births
January 18 – Francis Grant, painter (died 1878)
March 3 – Alexandre-Gabriel Decamps, painter (died 1860)
May 19 – Martinus Rørbye,  Danish genre painter (died 1848)
June 13 – Treffle Berthlaume, sculptor (died 1884)
July 24 – Alexander Jackson Davis, architect, illustrator (died 1892)
August 23 – Egide Charles Gustave Wappers, painter (died 1874)
September 13 – Jean Ignace Isidore Gérard ("J J Grandville"), caricaturist (died 1847)
September 28 – Adrian Ludwig Richter,  German painter and etcher (died 1884)
October 3 – Paul Huet, painter (died 1869)
November 25 – Sofia Ahlbom, Swedish drawing artist, engraver and lithographer (died 1868)

Deaths
January 8 – Domenico Cunego, Italian printmaker (born 1725)
January 22 – Giuseppe Baldrighi, Italian painter (born 1722)
April 24 – Adélaïde Labille-Guiard, historical and portrait painter (born 1749)
April 29 – Thomas Jones, Welsh artist of water colours and sketches (born 1742)
June 14 – José Camarón Bonanat, Spanish painter, mainly active in Valencia (born 1731)
July 8 – Francesco Giuseppe Casanova, Italian painter and a younger brother of Giacomo Casanova (born 1727)
November 25 – Joseph Wilton, sculptor (born 1722)
 date unknown
 John Bogle, Scottish miniature painter (born 1746)
 Giuseppe Camerata, Italian miniature painter and engraver (born 1718)
 Luigi Mayer, Italian-German painter (born 1755)
 Vasily Rodchev, Russian history painter (born 1768)
 William Verstille, American portrait artist (born 1757)
 Giovanni Volpato, Italian engraver, excavator, dealer in antiquities and manufacturer of biscuit porcelain figurines (born 1735)
 Xi Gang, Chinese calligrapher and painter of the Qing dynasty (born 1746)

References

 
Years of the 19th century in art
1800s in art